The French Institute of Science and Technology for Transport, Development and Networks (IFSTTAR) is a public research institution (a Public Scientific and Technical Research Establishment) created in 2011. It results from the merger of The French National Institute for Transport and Safety Research (INRETS) and the French Central Laboratory of Roads and Bridges (LCPC). 

The IFSTTAR is an associate member of University of Paris-Est and Université Lille Nord de France.

Sites 
 Lille-Villeneuve d'Ascq
 Paris
 Marne-la-Vallée
 Versailles-Satory
 Nantes
 Lyon-Bron
 Marseille-Salon de Provence

Notes and references

External links
Official website

Research institutes in France
Gustave Eiffel University